The Oensingen–Balsthal railway line is a standard gauge railway line in the canton of Solothurn in Switzerland. The  owns the line; Swiss Federal Railways operates scheduled passenger services.

History 

Operation 
Major freight customers on the line include Swiss Quality Paper, KEBAG AG, and Von Roll.

Notes

References 
 

Railway lines in Switzerland
Railway lines opened in 1899
1899 establishments in Switzerland
15 kV AC railway electrification